Elza may refer to:

Elza (given name), a feminine given name
Elza, the codename of Soviet spy Elizaveta Mukasei, active from the 1940s through the 1970s
Elza, Tennessee, community that existed before 1942 and is now part of the city of Oak Ridge